Omar Ahmad and Rafiq Jabir were the founders of the Council on American-Islamic Relations (CAIR), a Washington D.C.-based Muslim civil rights organization. He also worked for the Islamic Association of Palestine, a precursor to CAIR.

Biography
He was born in Amman, Jordan. He holds a Masters in Computer Science from Santa Clara University as well as a Masters in Political Science.

He had been the chairman of CAIR's board of directors since its founding in 1994, but stepped down from that position in May 2005. At the time that he resigned, CAIR claimed to be the largest Muslim civil liberties organization in the United States, with over 30 regional offices and chapters.

References

External links 
 

1959 births
Living people
American businesspeople
American Muslim activists
Jordanian emigrants to the United States
People from Amman
Santa Clara University alumni